Sir Henry Crewe, 7th Baronet (1763 – 6 February 1819), born Henry Harpur, was the only son of Sir Henry Harpur, 6th Baronet, and Frances Greville, the second daughter of Francis Greville, 1st Earl of Warwick. He was born in 1763 and took his place as the owner of the estate when his father died in 1789.

When he entered his upon his inheritance he became one of the richest land owners in Derbyshire with an income of £10000 a year. His principal home was the traditional family seat of Calke Abbey but he also took houses in the home counties to allow easy visits to London.

In 1792 Sir Henry married his mistress, a lady's maid called Ann or Nanny Hawkins. The marriage was described as an "unfortunate connection" by his mother Lady Frances and would have breached the usual conventions in society of the time.

Sir Henry died in a coaching accident where he was thrown from his carriage and landed on his head.

References

1763 births
1819 deaths
Baronets in the Baronetage of England
People from South Derbyshire District